Eleanor Jane Milner-Gulland (born 3 June 1967) is the Tasso Leventis Professor of Biodiversity and head of the Department of Zoology at the University of Oxford, and director of the Interdisciplinary Centre for Conservation Science. She is particularly known for her work on Saiga Antelope.

Early life and education
Milner-Gulland was born on 3 June 1967 in Cuckfield. She is the elder daughter of the renowned Russian scholar Robin Milner-Gulland and the artist Alison Milner-Gulland. She completed her undergraduate education at New College, Oxford in Pure and Applied Biology. She then went to Imperial College to complete a PhD in conservation biology supervised by John Beddington. Her thesis was entitled The exploitation of certain large mammals for trade : the implications for management which she submitted in 1991.

Career
After completing her PhD, Milner-Gulland became a junior research fellow at New College, Oxford. In 1994, she became a lecturer in mathematical ecology at the University of Warwick. In 1998, she moved back to Imperial College, where she stayed until 2015. In 2007, she was appointed Professor of Conservation Science. In 2015 she became the Tasso Leventis Professor of Biodiversity at the University of Oxford and a fellow of Merton College. In 2019 she became an official fellow of Parks College (later renamed Reuben College) where she was Theme Lead for Environmental Change. However, she moved back to Merton College in 2021.

Milner-Gulland is a conservation scientist whose work is at the interface of social and biological systems. She is the founder and chair of the Saiga Conservation Alliance and has launched a number of initiatives which aim to change the real-world conversation around conservation, including the Conservation Hierarchy approach to meeting a global vision of restoring nature and the Conservation Optimism movement. She is the Chair of the UK Government's Darwin Expert Committee and a Trustee of the UK WWF. In 2015, Milner-Gulland became a Pew Fellow of Marine Conservation. She is also a trustee of the Durrell Wildlife Conservation Trust.

Honours and awards
 Marsh Award for Conservation Biology (2001)
 Royal Society Wolfson Research Merit Award (2008)
 Marsh Ecology Award (2011)
 Society for Conservation Biology Distinguished Service Award (2019)

References

External links
 Professor EJ Milner Gulland homepage

1967 births
Living people
People from Cuckfield
Alumni of New College, Oxford
Alumni of Imperial College London
English zoologists
Fellows of Merton College, Oxford
Fellows of Reuben College, Oxford
Royal Society Wolfson Research Merit Award holders